Edison, Marconi & Co. is a 1928 Our Gang short silent comedy film directed by Anthony Mack. It was the 73rd Our Gang short released and is considered to have been lost in the 1965 MGM vault fire.

Cast

The Gang
 Joe Cobb as Joe
 Jackie Condon as Jackie
 Allen Hoskins as Farina
 Bobby Hutchins as Wheezer
 Jay R. Smith as Jay, a.k.a. J. Edison Westinghouse Smith
 Harry Spear as Harry
 Pete the Pup as himself

Additional cast
 Jean Darling as Undermined role
 Mildred Kornman as Undetermined role

See also
 List of American films of 1928
 Our Gang filmography

References

External links

1928 films
1928 comedy films
1928 short films
American silent short films
American black-and-white films
Films directed by Robert A. McGowan
Lost American films
Metro-Goldwyn-Mayer short films
Our Gang films
1928 lost films
Lost comedy films
Silent American comedy films
1920s American films
1920s English-language films
American comedy short films